The Tollhouse Stream is a watercourse in Hertfordshire, England. It rises in the Rye Meads a sewage treatment works on the northeastern bank of the River Lea close to Hoddesdon before flowing in a southeasterly direction. Treated effluent is discharged into the stream before merging with the River Stort shortly before its confluence with the River Lea.

References

Rivers of Hertfordshire
Thames drainage basin